WNC, or wnc, may refer to:

In astronomy
Winnecke Catalogue of Double Stars, catalogue of double stars published in 1869
Winnecke 4, also known as WNC 4, a double star in the constellation Ursa Major

In education
West Negros College, now STI West Negros University in the Philippines
Western Nevada College, in the United States
West Nottinghamshire College, the former name of Vision West Notts in Mansfield, United Kingdom

In geography
Western North Carolina, a region of North Carolina in the United States
 WNC (magazine), a Western North Carolina regional bimonthly
Washington National Cathedral, a cathedral of the Episcopal Church in the United States

In transport
 WNC, the National Rail code for Windsor & Eton Central railway station in the county of Berkshire, UK

In language
 wnc, the ISO 639-3 for the Wantoat language spoken in Papua New Guinea

In organizations
 West Nordic Council, a cooperation forum between Greenland, the Faroe Islands and Iceland.
Women's National Commission, a women's group based in the United Kingdom
World News Connection
Wrestling New Classic, Japanese professional wrestling promotion
Wistron NeWeb Corporation, a wireless communication products manufacturing company in Taiwan
WNC (Squat) from 1985 until 1990 in the former Wolters Noordhoff Complex in Groningen, the Netherlands.

See also